The following is an incomplete list of starting quarterbacks for the Saskatchewan Roughriders of the Canadian Football League that have started a regular season game for the team. This list includes postseason appearances since 1994, but does not include preseason games. They are listed in order of most starts with any tiebreaker being the date of each player's first start at quarterback for the Roughriders.

Season-by-season

Where known, the number of games they started during the season is listed to the right:

 * - Indicates that the number of starts is not known for that year for each quarterback

References
 CFL Record Book 2017
 Stats Crew Saskatchewan Roughriders
 CFLapedia
 CFLDB

St
Lists of Canadian Football League quarterbacks
Starting quarterbacks